Good Luck Girl!, known in Japan as , is a Japanese manga series written and illustrated by Yoshiaki Sukeno. The manga was serialized in Shueisha's shōnen manga magazine Jump Square from June 2008 to July 2013, with its chapters collected in sixteen tankōbon volumes. A thirteen-episode anime television series adaptation by Sunrise aired in Japan between July and September 2012.

Plot
Ichiko Sakura is a 16-year-old high schooler who has always been pretty lucky throughout her life. This is due to her body possessing an extraordinary amount of Fortune energy, which draws from its surroundings, causing the world to fall out of balance. To rectify this, a God of Misfortune named Momiji is sent to the human world to target Ichiko and steal her Fortune energy in order to rebalance the world.

Characters

Main characters

 A 16-year-old high school girl who has a high amount of Fortune energy that gives her extreme beauty, high intelligence, wealth and health. Her Fortune levels are so high that she unconsciously absorbs luck from others, causing them to be less fortunate. She is adored by the boys in high school whilst being loathed by the girls, and her sweet looks hide a fierce personality. Due to a past trauma, she has a fear of getting close to others as she doesn't want to be betrayed, often leaving her lonely. Using a magical item given to her by Bobby known as the Somin Shōrai, Ichiko can manifest her Fortune energy into stuffed animal-like versions of the Chinese zodiac. When extracted from her body, Ichiko's Fortune energy can be given to others who are in danger in order to help them.

 A God of Misfortune who is a woman clad in plaid undershirt, red overalls and a missing right shoe. She is sent from another world to restore the energy balance on Earth by stealing the Fortune energy from Ichiko, although her Misfortune energy often loses out to Ichiko's Fortune energy. Her right arm is so concentrated with misfortune that she wraps it up in a cast, using it as a support for various gadgets such as syringes. She is also capable of transforming into a spirit form in order to pass through barriers. She is constantly clashing with Ichiko as she tries to steal her Fortune energy, becoming particularly irritated when her flat chest is made fun of. Nonetheless, she often finds herself taking pity on Ichiko, often encouraging her to try to use her Fortune energy to help others. Whenever she takes a bath in the human world, she loses her Misfortune energy and changes to a brighter personality, but will return to normal if made dirty again. She has a habit of nose-picking, which is a tribute to the anime series FLCL, whose eccentric character, Haruko Haruhara, she in some ways resembles. At school (to find any opening Ichiko made), she goes by name Momiji Binbouda (貧保田 紅葉).

Humans

 A perverted African-American monk who travels the world to exterminate evil spirits or gods, though most of the time he is chasing after large-breasted women. He can sense Ichiko's happiness energy and is able to make Soumin Shourais.

A good-looking young man, and one of Ichiko's classmates. He works many part-time jobs in order to provide for his four siblings, which is also the cause of him sleeping through class; he serves as his siblings' guardian in the absence of his parents. Generally seen as the most serious of the cast, he will however take a keen interest in opportunities to make some money to provide for his family. It is later revealed that he actually was extremely popular with girls but due to the feelings and possessiveness Nadeshiko had toward him, Keita has never heard anything from other girls, as she uses various ways to prevent other girls from approaching Keita. After spending time with his family while she was in the form of a child, Ichiko gradually gains a romantic interest in him throughout the series. He similarly develops feelings for her after they become friends. By the end of the manga Ichiko and Keita are dating.

 A masculine girl who transfers into Ichiko's class, usually dressing like a male delinquent, having been raised like a boy by her father in order to succeed his karate dojo. Despite being tough on the outside, she often yearns to be in more in touch with her girlish side and has a crush on Keita. After Ichiko saves her life with happiness energy, Ranmaru becomes her first true friend, and the second person she has truly cared for since Suwano. She seemingly develops feelings for Momo'o Inugami, but after his departure at the end of the series, she agrees to date any boy who can defeat her in a fight.

 Introduced late in the manga series, Nadeshiko is a short child-like ninja who prides herself as a girl of superior upbringing. She is skilled in her ninjitsu art form in that she was able to lay traps and hiding places around Ichiko's house much to her and Momiji's chagrin. She is in love with Keita, having been saved by him once when they were kids and has been stalking him since, which is why she self-taught herself ninja skills and she is also the reason why other girls cannot get close to Keita. In the anime, she shows up at the end of each episode to point out her cameo appearances.

Nadeshiko's perverted butler, or specifically, perverted lolicon. He will never allow his master's breasts to grow more than the way they are.

Ichiko's former butler who had served as her guardian for a long time and was the first person she truly cared about. After he nearly dies as a result of all the fortune she had unconsciously taken from him over the years by Ichiko, Ichiko fires him from his position so he can live out his life in safety. He is currently travelling the world with his new wife. Throughout the story, Suwano continues to keeps in contact with Ichiko through a series of letters, which she treasures and keeps in a box.

One of Ichiko's classmates. She loathes Ichiko just like the other girls (except Ranmaru). She is always seen with her two friends. It is hinted that she cares about her appearance. She has long dark brown hair with her bangs styled into one side with two small hairpins. She develops a crush on Ranmaru Rindou, although any attempts to get closer to her result in comedic misinterpretations.

One of Ichiko's classmates. She also loathes Ichiko. She is easily recognized because of her big and fat appearance, making her the only one of the few students who is unattractive. She has dark skin with yellow hair tied into two pigtails with pink flower bands on each pigtail. She also wears make-up which only consists of lipstick and blush-on. She is always seen carrying or eating food (most notably onigiri).

 A seventh grader in middle school and one of Keita's younger siblings. She's a respectful and modest girl who wants her siblings to act respectful to their guests; she hated Ichiko at first after she had insulted their family, but then becomes more nicer to her after she rescues her brother Ryuuta from drowning.

 One of Keita's younger siblings with a fascination for sports. He wants to play soccer but due to financial difficulties, his family can't afford to put him in it.

 An elementary schooler and one of Keita's younger siblings.

 A happy two year old toddler and the youngest of Keita's siblings.

Gods

Momiji's loyal sidekick who is a demonic stuffed bear. As he cannot talk, he often communicates by writing messages in a book. His body holds many of Momiji's Misfortune items, which she just casually rips out of him. His human form gives him the appearance of a man with a goatee and long black hair tied back into a ponytail. While he gains the ability to talk in this state, Kumagai retains the trademark line of stitches running down the right side of his face that were present in his teddy bear form.

 Momiji's boss in the Misfortune God Realm, can be seen from her giant size. Implied to be a secret fan of glam rock. Her sidekick is Saffron, a panda-like stuff. Like Yamabuki, its size is bigger than Teddy.

 A masochistic dog god that is usually summoned by Momiji. He is capable of transforming into a chihuahua with a keen sense of smell, though he will be forced back into human form if he experiences too much pleasure, masochistic or otherwise. He later trains alongside Ranmaru in order to become stronger, causing the two to develop strong bond of friendship based on their shared desire to protect Ichiko and Momiji from harm.

A small kitten who Momiji arranges to have taken in by Ichiko to teach her what it is like to lose someone important to her. When Tama is put in danger due to Momiji's plan going too far, Ibuki injects Tama with some fortune energy but ends up using too much and transforming her into a Maneki-neko God.

 Also a God of Misfortune and a colleague of Momiji, the two grew up together and were once childhood friends. She came to the Human World to do Momiji's duty so that she can have Yamabuki's affection. Despite her desire to take the credit for the mission, Kuroyuri is a loyal friend at heart. Her sidekick is Gouda, a frog similar in form and purpose to Kumagai.

A toilet god whose head is shaped like a large poop. He gave Ichiko a necklace that prevents her from absorbing the fortune of other people.

Media

Manga
Written and illustrated by Yoshiaki Sukeno, Binbō-gami ga! was serialized in Shueisha's shōnen manga magazine Jump Square from June 4, 2008, to July 4, 2013. Shueisha collected its chapters in sixteen tankōbon volumes, published between November 4, 2008, and September 4, 2013.

Volume list

Anime
An anime adaptation by Sunrise aired in Japan between July 4 and September 26, 2012, and was licensed by Funimation Entertainment. Funimation released the series (under the title Good Luck Girl!) on Blu-ray/DVD combo pack on November 19, 2013.

Episode list

Notes

References

External links
  
  
  Funimation page
 
 

2008 manga
2012 anime television series debuts
Bandai Visual
Comedy anime and manga
Funimation
Shōnen manga
Shueisha franchises
Shueisha manga
Sunrise (company)
Supernatural anime and manga
Yōkai in anime and manga